Abba Bahrey (Ge'ez: ባሕርይ bāḥriy, "pearl") was a late 16th-century Ethiopian monk, historian, and ethnographer, from the southern region of Gamo. He is best known for his 1593 work on the history of the Oromo and their migrations in the 16th century, the "History of the Galla" ("Galla" being a historical and now pejorative term for the Oromo; ዜናሁ ፡ ለጋላ zēnāhū lagāllā). This short work is considered the ultimate source for information on the sixteenth century history of the Oromo: Manuel de Almeida borrowed heavily from Bahrey in writing his history of Ethiopia, and Hiob Ludolf derived much of his information on the Oromo from Baltazar Téllez's abridgment of Almeida's work.

Bahrey may also have been the author of Emperor Sarsa Dengel's chronicle, "The History of King Sarsa Dengel."

References

See also
Ethiopian historiography
History of Ethiopia
Sarsa Dengel

16th-century Ethiopian people
Ge'ez language
Ethiopian writers